Kaljord or Kaldjord is a village in Hadsel Municipality in Nordland county, Norway.  The village is located along the Hadselfjorden on the island of Hinnøya.  The area surrounding Kaljord is known as Innlandet or Hadsel Innland and it includes the neighboring villages of Hennes, Kvitnes, Kvantoelv, and Fiskfjord.

There are approximately 600 people that live in the area. Kaljord lies at the east end of the main road, with shops, petrol stations, a quay, and a ferry terminal (with connections to Lonkan and Hanøyvika, along the E10 highway).  There used to also be farms and a boat company in and around Kaljord.  Møysalen National Park is located a short distance to the east.

References

Villages in Nordland
Hadsel